The Tasmanian Gaelic Football and Hurling Association (TGFHA) was established in 2007 and is the ruling body for Gaelic Football and Hurling in the Australian state of Tasmania. The TGFHA is affiliated to the Gaelic Football and Hurling Association of Australasia where it is represented by a Vice-President.

The TGFHA runs weekly training and matches for both males and females in Gaelic Football at the North Chigwell Sports Ground during summer to avoid clashes with traditional winter sports such as Association Football and Australian Football. The TGFHA hopes to encourage involvement in Hurling in the future.

The TGFHA sends male and female Gaelic Football teams to interstate competitions annually.

Local Competition
The TGFHA runs men's and women's local 7-a-side Gaelic Football competitions with the following teams. The Men play for the Keiran Middleton trophy.

Men's
Lauderdale Bombers (formerly known as Clarence - first season 2011/12)
Hobart Celts (first season 2010/11)
Old Lindisfarne Saints (first season 2010/11)
Na Fianna Shamrocks (the result of a merger during the 2011/12 season between the Shamrocks - first season 2010/11 and Na Fianna - first season 2011/12)
Southern Falcons (first season 2013/14)
Hobart Tigers (first season 2015/16)

Women's
There is an active women's competition in Tasmania. The following teams have competed:
Hobart Celts
Shamrocks
North Hobart

Results

Source.

Tasmanian Blitz Tournament
The TGFHA host interstate Gaelic football teams from all over Australia in the annual Tasmanian Blitz Tournament in November.  The men play for the Mairtin MacMathuna Memorial Trophy.

See also

References

External links
TGFHA Official website
Australasia GAA website

Australasia GAA
Gaelic games governing bodies in Australia
Gaa
Irish-Australian culture
Organizations established in 2007